Emily Jo Harner (born February 1, 1963) is an American former soccer player, who played on the U.S. women's national soccer team in 1985, the first official U.S women's national team in history. She assisted the first goal for the national team, and scored the second (both against Denmark). Pickering was inducted into the Long Island Soccer Player Hall of Fame in 2015.

See also 
 1985 United States women's national soccer team

References

Further reading 
 Essays By Oxenham, Gwendolyn (2022), Pride Of A Nation:  A Celebration of the US Women's National Soccer Team, Ten Speed Press, 
 Goldman, Rob (2021), The Sisterhood:  The 99ers and the Rise of US Women's Soccer, University of Nebraska Press, 
 Grainey, Timothy (2012), Beyond Bend It Like Beckham: The Global Phenomenon of Women's Soccer, University of Nebraska Press, 
 Lisi, Clemente A. (2010), The U.S. Women's Soccer Team: An American Success Story, Scarecrow Press, 
 Nash, Tim (2016), It's Not the Glory: The Remarkable First Thirty Years of US Women's Soccer, Lulu Press, 

Living people
People from Long Island
Soccer players from New York (state)
United States women's international soccer players
1963 births
American women's soccer players
North Carolina Tar Heels women's soccer players
Women's association football midfielders